Nine Suitcases may refer to:

 Nine Suitcases (book), a Holocaust memoir by Béla Zsolt
 Nine Suitcases (play), a 2011 one-man stage play, based on the book